The Sticky & Sweet Tour was the eighth concert tour by American singer Madonna, to promote her eleventh studio album, Hard Candy (2008). It was Madonna's first major venture under a new ten-year 360 deal with Live Nation. Following a series of promotional appearances in support of Hard Candy, the tour was announced in May 2008, with concerts in Europe and North America; additionally, it marked the singer's first tour of Mexico and South America in fifteen years. It began in Cardiff on August 23, 2008, and ended in São Paulo on December 21. Afterwards, it was announced that Madonna had decided to resume the tour in the summer of 2009, with twenty-seven more concerts, mostly in European markets she had either never played in or visited in several years; the 2009 extension started at London's the O2 Arena on July 4 and concluded on September 2 in Tel Aviv. Though initially planned, the tour did not visit Australia due to financial problems and the financial recession. The show was described as a "rock driven dancetastic journey" and, like previous tours by the singer, was divided into different thematic acts: Pimp, Old School, Gypsy, and Rave.

It received generally positive reviews from critics, who praised the production, the singer's energy, and the performances. Besides positive reviews, the tour broke many records in terms of its ticket sales, commercial gross and audience attendance. After the 2008 leg, it became the highest-grossing tour by a solo artist, earning US$282 million ($ in  dollars) and breaking the previous record Madonna herself had set with her Confessions Tour two years earlier. With an additional $129 million generated from the 2009 extension, the final gross was reported to be $411 million ($ in  dollars); it became the second highest-grossing tour at the time and remains the highest-grossing tour ever for a female artist. Sticky & Sweet won Top Boxscore, Top Draw and Top Manager for Guy Oseary at the 2009 Billboard Touring Awards.

The tour generated some controversies: a video which compared then-presidential candidate John McCain to Hitler and Robert Mugabe faced criticism from the Republican Party; Madonna also publicly voiced her opposition against then-Republican Vice Presidential candidate Sarah Palin. While performing in Romania in 2009, Madonna's statement about Romani discrimination in Eastern European countries was negatively received by the crowd. A planned concert at Marseille's Stade Vélodrome was cancelled following an incident that killed two workers. The concerts at Buenos Aires River Plate Stadium in December 2008 were recorded and broadcast through Sky1 as Madonna: Sticky & Sweet. The special was also aired many times through American network EPIX. In 2010, it was released on DVD, Blu-ray and as a live album under the title Sticky & Sweet Tour.

Background 

In October 2007, Madonna announced her departure from Warner Bros. Records, and signed a $120 million, ten-year 360 deal with Live Nation; the deal would encompass her future music-related businesses, including touring, merchandising and associated sponsorship agreements, among other things. In March 2008, The Sunday Telegraph reported that Madonna was preparing to visit Australia as part of an upcoming concert tour; music promoter and manager Michael Chugg stated that a 2008-2009 world tour, including Australia, "will happen" and was "being talked about [....] there is a promoter trying to put it together". During an interview with radio station Z100-FM, Madonna said there was a possibility she would tour during the fall of 2008; one month later, the Daily Mirror reported that the tour would kick off on September at London's Wembley Stadium, and that Madonna was in "final negotiations" with organizers to sort out dates.

Hard Candy, Madonna's final studio album with Warner Bros., was released on April 29, 2008. One day after the album's release, she offered a small concert in New York City's Roseland Ballroom, where she sang songs from the album in front of an audience of 2,200 people. Furthermore, she performed on Paris Olympia hall and closed the first night of the BBC Radio 1's Big Weekend. On May 1, during a visit to On Air with Ryan Seacrest, the singer confirmed a tour for the fall. Titled Sticky & Sweet Tour, it was officially announced one week later by Live Nation executive Arthur Fogel; the first major manifestation of the ten-year deal between Madonna and Live Nation. Set to begin in August, it would visit Europe until the end of September, before moving on to North America in October and November, followed by South America in early December. It was Madonna's first visit to Mexico and South America since The Girlie Show in 1993.

In November 2008, The Sunday Telegraph reported that the singer would offer concerts on Sydney's ANZ Stadium and Melbourne's Telstra Dome in late January 2009, but said concerts were eventually cancelled; promoter Michael Coppel explained that "[Madonna] was coming to Australia, the dates were resolved, then economics got in the way". On January 30, it was announced that Madonna had decided to resume the tour in the summer of 2009, with twenty-seven more concerts across Europe. The Sticky & Sweet Tour officially kicked off on Cardiff's Millennium Stadium on August 23, 2008, and wrapped up at the Morumbi Stadium on São Paulo on December 2. The 2009 extension started at London's The O2 Arena on July 4 and ended on September 2 in Tel Aviv, Israel.

Development 
The tour was described as a "rock driven dancetastic journey". In typical Madonna fashion, the show was divided into different thematic acts: Pimp, a homage to 1920s deco and modern-day gangsta pimp; Old School, which referenced the dance vibe of early 1980s downtown New York City, with nods to the work of deceased artist Keith Haring; Gypsy, inspired by the "spirit of Romani folk music and dance", and lastly Rave, an uptempo segment that included Middle Eastern influences. Jamie King was once again appointed creative director; Kevin Antunes was hired as musical director and keyboards player. The rest of the troupe included backup singers Kiley Dean and Nicki Richards, Monte Pittman on guitar, 12 dancers including Sofia Boutella, dancing duo Hamutsun Serve, and Alexander and Vladim Kolpakov. NME further reported 250 crew members, 69 guitars, 12 trampolines, and 100 pairs of kneepads.

The stage was smaller than the one for the Confessions Tour; it was T-shaped and included a runway with a conveyor belt that led to a B-stage, and was flanked by two giant pink 'M's, embroidered with $2-million worth of Swarovski crystals. 17 high-definition video screens—the three largest were 20x20 ft―formed the backdrops. Throughout the show, the screens moved to create a single seamless display 60 ft wide and 20 ft high; the largest screens were controlled by XLNT's InMotion3D software running on a CyberHoist FPS full production system with dual Apple Mac Pros, that were handled by senior programmer and project manager Martin Hoop. Also present were moving screens which Madonna used on several numbers, such as  "Beat Goes On" and "4 Minutes", which featured video duets with Pharrell Williams and Justin Timberlake, respectively.

One of the show's most "engaging" elements was a pair of concentric cylindrical stealth screens that descended from the ceiling for numbers such as "Beat Goes On" and "Devil Wouldn't Recognize You". Video engineer Jason Harvey explained that the screen was "not really meant to be circular"; it was made up of several flat panels that were customized to give it a round shape using  "cable ties and a couple small uprights". For the visuals, Henry also used Mac Pros. Footage would be sent from places such as London, New York and Los Angeles; video backdrops included one with brightly colored, childlike animations in the style Keith Haring, used for the performance of "Into the Groove". For "Human Nature", a video featuring Britney Spears trapped in an elevator was used. Madonna explained that the visual was meant to be video an analogy for the state of Spears' career back then: "Didn't that explain what I thought? 'I'm not your bitch, don't hang your shit on me'", the singer recalled. Marilyn Minter's Green Pink Caviar, which showed a giant tongue licking and spitting out neon-colored icing, was used as backdrop for the performance of "Candy Shop" during the 2009 extension. Props used on the show included an M-shaped throne, a 1935 Auburn Speedster, and a boxing ring.

Designers working on the tour include Arianne Phillips, Riccardo Tisci for Givenchy, Stella McCartney, and Jeremy Scott, among others. For the first act, Pimp, Madonna wore clothes created by Givenchy; a reference to gangsta pimp, Art Deco and her "longest-running fashion inspiration", the dominatrix, this look consisted of a frock coat in black stretch satin, trimmed with pleated black silk organza and embroidered with jet beads, as well as a black satin waistcoat trimmed with black silk fringes. She also wore thigh-high boots by Stella McCartney. Created for the Old School segment, Jeremy Scott's outfit was a nod to the singer's early days in 1980s New York, and included custom sneakers decorated with art by Keith Haring. Scott recalled that "[Haring] and Madonna were friends. If he were alive, it would be his 50th birthday as well. So I thought, 'What if we revisited that?'". Tisci also created the clothes for the Gypsy act, which featured a long-hooded cape in black silk taffeta, lined in fuchsia silk taffeta and embroidered with jet stones, and a black stretch chiffon dress trimmed with multi-colored ribbons and fuchsia colored metal chains, worn with a matching necklace. The final act, Rave, had "lots of Japanese influences", with the singer wearing sequined shoulder pads. Additional clothes included shoes by Miu Miu, Moschino sunglasses and accessories by Roberto Cavalli; Tom Ford created bespoke clothes for the band. Arianne Phillips concluded that "[Madonna] always wants to push the envelope. There are no vanity considerations based on her age [...] She looks good in everything".

For the 2009 extension, a new outfit was created by Tisci for the opening Pimp act; it consisted of a feathered "super couture, sensual, goth, bondage"-inspired look. Tisci explained that he wanted to "give a very iconic view of Madonna [...] She's wearing an outfit that will make history. I wanted to do something even stronger [than what he designed for the 2008 leg] because she wants to be stronger". The male dancers also wore new clothes by Brooks Brothers, including tennis collar white tuxedo shirts.

Concert synopsis 

The concert was divided into four thematic segments: Pimp, Old School, Gypsy, and Rave. It began with "The Sweet Machine", a 3D animation video displaying candy being manufactured and used as a Pinball. As the video ended, "Candy Shop" began with Madonna appearing on the M-shaped throne in the Givenchy-designed dress, sitting with her legs spread apart and holding a staff in her hands. She was accompanied by her dancers in bondage themed costumes as images of gumdrops and candy flashed on the backdrops. For "Beat Goes On", the singer and dancers rode on the Auburn Speedster while Pharrell Williams and Kanye West appeared on the screens. A remixed "Human Nature", with Madonna playing electric guitar, followed; the video of Britney Spears trapped in an elevator played on the screens behind her. A mashup of  "Vogue" and "4 Minutes", and a video interlude of "Die Another Day" ―featuring Madonna as a boxer on screen, and dancers mimicking a boxing match onstage― closed the act.

The Old School segment began with "Into the Groove": Madonna was dressed in gym shorts, jumped rope and did a double Dutch dance interlude which led to "Heartbeat". During that song, the singer's dance movements were controlled by back-up dancers as if they were puppeteers. Next came a rock rendition of "Borderline", with Madonna playing guitar. For "She's Not Me", footage of her past videos flashed onscreen; it also saw her making fun of her past incarnations and styles, with four dancers dressed like her in the "Like a Virgin", "Material Girl", "Open Your Heart", and "Vogue" music videos. The act ended with "Music", which sampled Fedde Le Grand's "Put Your Hands Up 4 Detroit" (2006) and Indeep's "Last Night a DJ Saved My Life" (1982). The backdrops depicted a New York City subway train covered with graffiti and, towards the end, the singer and dancers disappeared behind two screens mimicking the subway's doors.

An interlude of "Rain", remixed with  Eurythmics's "Here Comes the Rain Again" (1984), opened the Gypsy act. The video showed an animated pixie finding shade under a petal during a rainstorm and had duo Hamutsun Serve doing an Asian-inspired choreography. "Devil Wouldn't Recognize You" featured Madonna atop a piano, cloaked in a black shroud; she was surrounded by the cylindrical video screen, which showed imagery of waves splashing and rainfall. Madonna then performed "Spanish Lesson", which had Vadim Kolpakov doing a flamenco-influenced dance solo. She played guitar once again for "Miles Away" as images of airports flashed on the background. "La Isla Bonita" featured the Ukrainian-gypsy group Kolpakov Trio, and incorporated lyrical elements of gypsy song "Lela Pala Tute". At the end of the song, Madonna marched ahead with a band of violin players to the front of the stage, and sat aside with her dancers for a solo performance from Kolpakov Trio, who sang a song titled "Doli Doli". The act ended with "You Must Love Me", the Academy Award winning song from Evita (1996), which saw Madonna playing guitar as scenes of the movie played on the screens.

"Get Stupid" was the video interlude that opened the Rave segment; set to a remixed "Beat Goes On", it depicted images of global warming, famine and other global issues, while juxtaposing John McCain with Hitler and Barack Obama with Gandhi. Madonna then appeared on stage for "4 Minutes", wearing the sequined shoulder pads and a fringed wig. The performance had Justin Timberlake and Timbaland appearing on screens. A remix of "Like a Prayer" followed, featuring elements from "Feels Like Home" and the screens depicting messages from the Bible, the Quran, the Torah and the Talmud. The singer again played electric guitar for "Ray of Light". Afterwards, she sought audience participation, asking them to request for "an oldie but goodie"; she then would usually sing the first verse and chorus of the requested song, before moving onto a rock version of "Hung Up". After a brief video featuring a modern take on classic arcade games was played, Madonna returned on stage for the final performance, "Give It 2 Me", which ended with a sing-along of the chorus. The show ended with the words "Game Over" appearing on the video screens.

2009 revisions 
Several changes were made for the 2009 extension; Green Pink Caviar was used as backdrop during the opening "Candy Shop", which also saw Madonna dressed in the new Givenchy outfit. "Heartbeat" was replaced by "Holiday", which incorporated elements of her then-latest single "Celebration", and her first single "Everybody". The number included a tribute to Michael Jackson, who had passed shortly before the tour began; a medley of his songs "Billie Jean" and "Wanna Be Startin' Something" played as dancer Kento Mori, dressed in Jackson's trademark black and white outfit, with a wide-brimmed hat and white gloves, began performing his most famous moves, including moonwalking across the stage. "Dress You Up" replaced "Borderline"; it featured musical elements of the Knack's "My Sharona" and "God Save the Queen" by the Sex Pistols. "Hung Up" was removed and instead, a house rendition of "Frozen" was performed. It sampled Calvin Harris' "I'm Not Alone" and included lyrical elements of Madonna's own "Open Your Heart"; video outtakes from the song's music video, directed by Chris Cunningham, were used as backdrops during this performance. On the screens, the phrase "If you want to make the world a better place look inside yourself and make a change", taken from Jackson's 1988 song "Man in the Mirror", flashed before the performance of "Ray of Light"; for the encore of "Give It 2 Me", Madonna and her dancers all donned jeweled gloves on their right hand, another nod to Jackson.

Critical reception 

The Sticky & Sweet Tour was positively received by critics. The Guardians Amelia Hill said that "[Madonna] may have turned 50, but the opening show of her world tour in Cardiff proved the queen of pop is still into the groove". Similarly, Ian Youngs from BBC News opined that Madonna was "proving to fans that she can still cut it on stage at the age of 50", and said the show had the "feel of a giant nightclub - and that is something that some purists didn't like". For CTV News, Darcy Wintonyk said that "the entire two-hour show was truly a testament to the unstoppable energy of a pop icon who celebrated her 50th birthday only two months ago". From This Is London, John Aizlewood noted that the tour was "less overtly sexual than its predecessors, but like them it's an all-singing, all-leaping, thrillingly choreographed extravaganza". On her review of the concert at East Rutherford, Nekesa Mumbi Moody from USA Today referred to Sticky & Sweet as a "show defined by throbbing dance music, tight choreography, spectacular stage sets and stunning visuals", noting that "even the superstar's most cynical critics couldn't walk away from her two-hour extravaganza without [...] being thoroughly wowed". The New York Posts Dan Aquilante deemed it Madonna's best tour and highlighted the "terrific" production and "well-thought-out" dance routines that "showed off [Madonna's] ability to move to the music she makes". Production was also applauded by The Patriot Ledger Jay N. Miller, who called it "world class", and George Varga from SignOn San Diego, who hailed it "eye-popping". According to the Boston Heralds Jed Gottlieb, Sticky & Sweet proved to be "a stage show no one can touch - not JT, not MJ, not Pink Floyd: epic lasers, moving video screens, fast and flawless costume changes, all done with grace and energy".

Dan DeLuca from The Philadelphia Inquirer called it "aerobically relentless". Neseka Mumbi Moody concluded that Madonna "is not the world's most gifted singer or dancer or even musician, but she may be its greatest performer" who "proved to be more than relevant". Scott Cronik from The Press of Atlantic City wrote: "At 50 years old, Madonna remains the single most relevant female pop star in the world. If the "Sticky & Sweet Tour" affirms one thing, it's that [she] still holds the title of "Queen of Pop." And it looks like she's not ready to relinquish it any time soon". Dan Aquilante said that with Sticky & Sweet, Madonna "lived up to her reputation as the queen of pop"; Darcy Wintonyk expressed that "if there was ever any question that Madonna was still the Queen of pop, it was settled once and for all at her sold out show last night at B.C. Place". Jed Gottlieb concluded that "Madonna may not make great movies or marriages but she makes great music. And even in her (almost) golden years she's still a ray of light". For the Orlando Sentinels Matthew Palm, "the one-time Material Girl delivered the goods with an energetic, visually stimulating show that kept the crowd roaring until after midnight". Greg Kot, writing for the Chicago Tribune, praised the singer's mood and noted that she seemed to be enjoying herself more than on previous tours; "Madonna having fun on stage? Exuding warmth rather than wielding a riding crop? Yes, it happened, a refreshing break from recent tours which presented a woman on a take-no-prisoners mission".

From Blast magazine, Dinah Alobeid felt the Hard Candy cuts "translated well to dance-filled stage numbers" and singled out "Heartbeat", "She's Not Me", and "Give It 2 Me". This opinion was shared by the Toronto Suns Jane Stevenson, who felt it was the new material that "shone brightest", and also singled out the performance of "Heartbeat". The Denver Posts Ricardo Baca highlighted the performances of "Into the Groove" and "La Isla Bonita" as a "delightful explosion of color" and "the show's brightest, boldest, most daring moment [...] a triumph of reinvention", respectively. George Varga applauded the "lively" renditions of "Human Nature", "Vogue", "Into the Groove", and "Heartbeat". Nekesa Mumbi Moody noted that many of the singer's "classics", such as "La Isla Bonita", "Like a Prayer", and "Ray of Light", "weren't relegated to short renditions during the retrospective medley part of the show, like many veterans do", but were given "full attention with colorful, dazzling displays and new arrangements that made them seem as exciting and fresh as when they first made their debut". Isabel Albiston from The Daily Telegraph also singled out "La Isla Bonita", the "striking" New York subway train visuals on "Music", and the "high-energy, crowd-pleasing" "Hung Up". Slants Paul Schrodt pointed out that "a little bit of her Erotica-era cheekiness reappears" in numbers such as "Vogue" and "Into the Groove". Critics also praised the visuals during the performance of "Devil Wouldn't Recognize You". Sonia Murray concluded that "Madonna, The Pop Star of a quarter century now, still put on an impressive stage show, reimagining catalog hits like 'Vogue' and 'Borderline' with new musical vibrance". The performance of "Like a Prayer" and Madonna's vocals during "You Must Love Me" were also singled out for praise.

Jim Harrington from East Bay Times wrote: "Gone are the days of convoluted storylines (2001's Drowned World Tour), heavy-handed themes (2004's Re-Invention Tour) and controversial antics (2006's Confessions, during which Madonna hung herself on a huge cross). This time around, the Material Girl just wants to [...] show her fans a good time". Harrington further pointed out that "by Madonna standards, [Sticky & Sweet] was a fairly straightforward 24-song affair. In fact the most shocking thing about the show was that there was nothing really shocking about it!". In a similar note, Kitty Empire from The Guardian expressed that "usually, the first few dates of a world tour staged by Michigan's biggest export since the automobile are rife with controversy [...] this year's Sticky & Sweet world tour feels different. Less sticky, perhaps".

In more critical reviews, Isabel Albiston pointed out the times when "[Madonna] seemed strained and lacked the effortless confidence of previous years. In the opening half of the show, she struggled to involve the crowd, who responded half-heartedly to her newer tracks". Greg Kot opined that "in many ways, [Sticky & Sweet] is more of the same. But it was less muddled by high-concept statements, and threw itself into a low-concept sweat. [...] Big ideas were conspicuously absent"; Kot wasn't fond of the Gypsy act either. Also criticized were the numbers in which Madonna played guitar; Paul Schrodt deemed them "uninspired rock-star moments" while Jon Pareles found them awkward. Stuart Derdeyn concluded his review: "When [Sticky & Sweet] worked well, and it mostly did, we got the star revelling in her power and some engaging staging and songs. When it bombed, what was on stage was the kind of uncontrollable ego that is the product of believing that the way you are worshipped allows you to make grand statements and 'get deep'". Finally, for Aidin Vaziri from the San Francisco Chronicle, "[the concert] was OK. Even if the new songs feel a little like Gwen Stefani's leftovers, suggesting that, for once, [Madonna] has actually fallen behind the pop-culture curve she always capitalized on so brilliantly".

Critical reception for the 2009 extension ranged from positive to mixed. On his review of the concert at London's O2 Arena, The Guardians Alex Macpherson highlighted the Michael Jackson tribute during "Holiday", but criticized the "mundanity" of performances such as "She's Not Me", and the cameos of Kanye West, Britney Spears, and Justin Timberlake; "trying to prove her youthfulness, trendiness and good heart are goals which should be beneath Madonna. She has a back catalogue like no other, and it serve[d] her well enough to redeem tonight's show". From La Vanguardia, Lourdes López dismissed the Barcelona concert as a "low intensity live show from which more was expected", and criticized Madonna's "irregular" vocals. Lisa Verrico, writing for The Times, opined that the concert "delivered in spades from start to finish. Madonna was magnificent [...] remaining the primary focus of a show that had more props and moving parts than a magicians' convention could muster". However, the review noted that the singer relied heavily on pre-recorded vocals, and the music was "frequently driven by synthesised beats than her smartly-attired, five-piece band". The author concluded that "to criticize Madonna for placing style over substance is missing the point of the Queen Of Pop [...] The music may have come second, but the highest-earning tour of 2008 still sparkles".

On their rankings of Madonna's concert tours, VH1's Christopher Rosa and The Odyssey's Rocco Papa placed Sticky & Sweet in the sixth and seventh position, respectively; the former called it "so damn fun" and "a tireless display of  showmanship. A sugar rush, really", while the latter highlighted the "sense of fun and connection to the audience that was consistent throughout the show". The Advocates Gina Vivinetto placed it fifth on her ranking.

Commercial reception 

Arthur Fogel explained that price for tickets would be "basically the same as they've been the past two tours," ranging from $55 to $350. According to Event Ticket Report, by June 2008, two months before starting, tour tickets were already 90% sold out. Billboard predicted the singer would "break her own record", and surpass her Confessions Tour as the highest-grossing tour for a female artist with over $200 million in ticket sales. The Sticky & Sweet Tour broke many records in terms of gross and revenue; on August 30, 2008, Madonna  performed to a sell-out crowd of over 72,000 in a single concert in Zurich, which became the largest audience ever for a concert in Switzerland. On September 11, the sole concert at Wembley Stadium drew 74,000 fans and grossed over $12 million, surpassing all previous grosses at both the old and new Wembley Stadiums. The concert at Paris' Stade de France sold 80,000 tickets in less than ten days, prompting organizers to add a second date, which also sold out; overall, the two concerts grossed $17.5 million and drew 138,163 people. 

The American leg was also a success. Concerts in Oakland, Las Vegas and Denver sold out almost instantly, leading to second dates being added. 50,000 tickets for the concert at Vancouver's BC Place Stadium were sold in 29 minutes. Due to instant sellouts in Toronto and Montreal, second shows were added in both cities. Further sell-outs included New York City, Boston and Chicago. Madonna's four shows at Madison Square Garden added up to a record breaking 23 sold-out performances since 2001 at that venue—a record for most appearances for a single artist that decade. Brian Garrity from the New York Post reported that tickets for the US stadium dates sold slower than for other venues; just over half of the 43,000 seats available for the concert at Los Angeles Dodger Stadium – around 27,000 – were sold out on its first three weeks of going on sale. The shows at Petco Park stadium in San Diego and Miami's Dolphin Stadium also saw slow sales. The 96,000 tickets available for the Mexico concerts were sold out in just 132 minutes. In November 2008, Billboard reported that Sticky & Sweet had grossed 162 million ($ in  dollars) and included it third on its list of top Boxscores for the year. One month later, it was named the biggest grossing music tour of 2008 in North America by Pollstar.

The Latin American concerts proved to be particularly successful. 60,000 tickets for one of the concerts in Buenos Aires River Plate Stadium sold out in just three hours. Due to strong sales, additional dates were added in Río de Janeiro, São Paulo and Santiago de Chile. Upon completion, the 2008 leg of the Sticky & Sweet Tour grossed $282 million ($ in  dollars), making it the most lucrative tour of 2008; it also became the highest-grossing tour for a solo artist.

Just days after the 2009 leg was announced, Billboard reported that over 1 million tickets worth $100 million were already sold out. Tickets for the London and Manchester shows sold out in just minutes. Over 70,000 tickets were sold for the Belgium concert in a "one-day sell-out event", while all entrances for the Oslo show were sold in under 30 minutes. All 70,300 for the Tallinn were sold out within a day; Madonna broke a record previously held by Metallica, whose tickets for their 2006 concert, at the same venue, sold out in three days. In Helsinki, she played in front of an audience of 76,000; it was the largest audience for a concert ever organized in Finland; Gothenburg's performance was also an immediate sell-out with over 55,000 tickets sold in two hours. Due to high demand, a second concert in Tel Aviv was added. The 2009 extension grossed in $222,017,248 from 46 sold-out concerts. After finishing, Sticky & Sweet became the highest-grossing tour by a solo artist, grossing over $400 million ($ in  dollars) from 85 shows in 52 countries, with an attendance of 3.5 million; it was the second highest-grossing tour of all time, only behind the Rolling Stones' A Bigger Bang Tour (2005–07) which earned $558 million ($ in  dollars). Pollstar reported a gross of US$411 million ($ in  dollars). It won Top Boxscore, Top Draw and Top Manager for Guy Oseary at the 2009 Billboard Touring Awards. Sticky & Sweet remains the highest-grossing tour ever for a female artist.

Controversies 

The "Get Stupid" video caused controversy in the political world, as it showed then-Republican presidential candidate John McCain alongside pictures of Hitler and Robert Mugabe. Tucker Bounds, spokesperson for McCain, said that "the comparisons are outrageous, unacceptable and crudely divisive all at the same time". By contrast, another part of the video depicted then-Democratic candidate Barack Obama with pictures of John Lennon, Gandhi and Al Gore; Tommy Vetor, spokesperson for Obama's camp, also spoke out against the video and deemed it "outrageous and offensive [with] no place in the political process". During the concert at Petco Park, Madonna celebrated Obama's win for presidency; "I'm so fucking happy right now! Are you as happy as I am?", she asked the crowd. "Let's hear it for [Barack] Obama! It's the best day of my life". The video screens showed images of Obama along with the message "We Won". Madonna also publicly voiced her opposition for then-Republican Vice Presidential candidate Sarah Palin; on the New Jersey concert, she shouted: "Sarah Palin can't come to my party. Sarah Palin can't come to my show. It's nothing personal. [...] Here's the sound of Sarah Palin's husband's snowmobile when it won't start", followed by a loud screeching noise. When she sang "I Love New York" on Madison Square Garden, she told the audience: "You know who can get off of my street? Sarah Palin! I'm gonna kick her ass if she don't get off of my street". She then mocked Palin's accent before sarcastically telling the audience that she "love[s] her". While attending the premiere of her directorial debut Filth and Wisdom, Madonna dismissed her threats to Palin as a metaphor.

In London, Madonna was fined £135,000 for exceeding her allowed stage time at Wembley stadium. During her show at Rome's Stadio Olimpico, she dedicated "Like a Virgin" to Pope Benedict XVI; before singing, she said "I dedicate this song to the Pope, because I'm a child of God". Italian newspaper Corriere della Sera said it was a "provocation that will certainly be discussed". On the Bucharest concert, included on the tour's 2009 extension, the singer addressed Romani discrimination; "it has been brought to my attention ... that there is a lot of discrimination against Romanies and Gypsies in general in Eastern Europe. [...] It made me feel very sad". Immediately, boos and jeers resounded from the audience prompting Madonna to add that "[w]e don't believe in discrimination [...] we believe in freedom and equal rights for everyone". Liz Rosenberg, her publicist, issued a statement saying that "[Madonna] has been touring with a phenomenal troupe of Roma musicians who made her aware of the discrimination toward them in several countries so she felt compelled to make a brief statement. She will not be issuing a further statement".

Marseille incident 

On July 16, 2009, at around 17:15 GMT, while production was being set up for the July 19 show at Marseille's Stade Vélodrome, the stage collapsed, injuring eight workers and killing two: 53-year-old Charles Criscenzo, who died on the spot, and 23-year-old Charles Prow from Headingley, Leeds, who died overnight at a hospital. According to firefighters, the roof of the stage became unbalanced as it was being lifted by four cranes, eventually toppling one of them. Marseille city councillor Maurice de Nocera explained that, since the collapse didn't happen right away, several people were able to get out unharmed. The concert was cancelled following the incident.

During her concert in Udine, Madonna paid tribute to the deceased technicians with a speech: "Two men lost their lives, which is a great tragedy to me [...] I feel so devastated to be in any way associated with anyone's suffering. So let's all just take a moment to say a prayer for Charles Criscenzo and Charlie Prow". The day of the planned concert, Madonna arrived in Marseille to visit Criscenzo's family and pay her respects, before visiting the injured workers at the hospital. She also issued the following statement: "I am devastated to have just received this tragic news. My prayers go out to those who were injured and their families along with my deepest sympathy to all those affected by this heartbreaking news". The singer was not, however, given permission to visit the stadium, as the accident investigation was taking place.

Almost twelve years later, in February 2021, a French court convicted four people of involuntary manslaughter and injuries, while acquitting three others ordered to stand trial: Jacqueline Bitton, then head of the French division of Live Nation, received a suspended two-year prison term and a fine of €20,000. Tim Norman, head of Edwin Shirley Group that owned the stage, received a suspended two-year term as well as a €15,000 fine; a manager at a French subcontractor hired by Edwin Shirley Group was given a suspended 18-month sentence and a €10,000 fine, while a British foreman hired by Edwin Shirley Group got an 18 months suspension. Finally, Live Nation France was ordered to pay a €150,000 fine, and Tour Concept €50,000.

Broadcast and recording 

On December 3, 2008, Madonna released a statement announced the rescheduling of the concerts in Buenos Aires; the statement also said the shows would "continue to be filmed for later broadcast". Sky1 acquired the rights to broadcast the tour, which was aired as Madonna: Sticky & Sweet on July 4, 2009; a Live Nation production, it was directed by Nathan Rissman, who had worked with the singer on the documentary I Am Because We Are. On September 19, DirecTV's Cityvibe aired the special and, one month later, it was broadcast through American network EPIX; executive Mark Greenberg wanted to launch the channel with an "iconic" event that would "set the bar for what we believe our brand should be". The special aired multiple times on the channel and was also available through its website EPIXhd.com. To promote the broadcast on EPIX, Billboard published the performance of "Into the Groove" on its website. Madonna: Sticky & Sweet also aired on VH1 on April 2, 2010.

On January 12, 2010, Madonna's official website confirmed a video release. The singer was not involved in putting together the DVD as she was too busy working on her directorial debut, W.E. (2011).  Sticky & Sweet Tour was released on DVD, Blu-ray and CD on March 30; it included 30 minutes of backstage footage as bonus material. Upon release, it received generally mixed review from critics, who felt it was "lifeless" and not among Madonna's best live albums, but praised numbers like "Into the Groove". It became Madonna's 19th top-ten album on the Billboard 200. Additionally, a picture book titled Madonna: Sticky & Sweet was created by Guy Oseary and released on February through powerHouse Books.

Set list 
Set lists, samples and notes adapted per Madonna's official website, the notes and track listing of Sticky & Sweet Tour, and additional sources.
{{hidden
| headercss = background: #ccccff; font-size: 100%; width: 90%;
| contentcss = text-align: left; font-size: 100%; width: 90%;
| header = 2008
| content =
Act 1: Pimp
 "The Sweet Machine" 
 "Candy Shop" 
 "Beat Goes On" 
 "Human Nature" 
 "Vogue" 
 "Die Another Day" 
Act 2: Old School
"Into the Groove" 
 "Heartbeat"
 "Borderline"
 "She's Not Me"
 "Music" 
Act 3: Gypsy
"Rain" / "Here Comes the Rain Again" 
 "Devil Wouldn't Recognize You"
 "Spanish Lesson"
 "Miles Away"
 "La Isla Bonita" / "Lela Pala Tute"
 "Doli Doli" 
 "You Must Love Me"
Act 4: Rave
"Get Stupid" 
 "4 Minutes"
 "Like a Prayer" 
 "Ray of Light"
 "Hung Up" 
 "Give It 2 Me"
}}

{{hidden
| headercss = background: #ccccff; font-size: 100%; width: 90%;
| contentcss = text-align: left; font-size: 100%; width: 90%;
| header = 2009
| content =
Act 1: Pimp
 "The Sweet Machine" 
 "Candy Shop" 
 "Beat Goes On" 
 "Human Nature" 
 "Vogue" 
 "Die Another Day" 
Act 2: Old School
"Into the Groove" 
"Holiday" 
"Dress You Up" 
 "She's Not Me"
 "Music" 
Act 3: Gypsy
"Rain" / "Here Comes the Rain Again" 
 "Devil Wouldn't Recognize You"
 "Spanish Lesson"
 "Miles Away"
 "La Isla Bonita" / "Lela Pala Tute"
 "Doli Doli" 
 "You Must Love Me"
Act 4: Rave
"Get Stupid" 
 "4 Minutes"
 "Like a Prayer" 
"Frozen" 
 "Ray of Light"
 "Give It 2 Me" 
}}

Shows

Cancelled dates

Notes

Personnel 
Adapted from the Sticky & Sweet Tour programs.

Band 
Madonna –  creator, vocals, guitar
Kiley Dean - vocals
Nicki Richards - vocals
Kevin Antunes - musical director, keyboards, programmer 
Brian Frasier-Moore - drums
Ric'key Pageot - piano, keyboards, accordion
Monte Pittman - guitar, vocals, cowbell
Eric Jao "DJ Enferno" - turntables
Arkadiy Gips - violin, vocals
Alexander Kolpakov - guitar, vocals
Vladim Kolpakov - guitar, vocals, dancer
Sean Spuehler - sound design
Demetrius Moore - audience mic master

Dancers 
Leroy Barnes Jr. - dancer
Sofia Boutella - dancer
Jaron Boyd - dancer
Emilie Capel - dancer
Williams Charlemoine - dancer
Paul Kirkland - dancer
Jennifer Kita - dancer
Kento Mori - dancer
Yaman Okur - dancer
Charles Parks IV - dancer
Valeree Pohl - dancer
Anthony Rue II - dancer
Nilaya Sabnis - dancer
Jason Young - dancer
Rikiccho - dancer
Dah-yoshi - dancer
Tiffany Saxby - dancer

Choreographers 
Stefanie Roos - supervising choreographer
Richmond Talauega - choreographer
Anthony Talauega - choreographer
Jamal Sims - choreographer
Dondraico Johnson - assistant choreographer
RJ Durell - choreographer
Alison Faulk - assistant choreographer
Aakomon Jones - choreographer
Aljamaal Jones - choreographer
Jason Young - choreographer
Rikiccho - Hamutsun Serve choreography
Dah-yoshi - Hamutsun Serve choreography
Charles Parks - footwork choreography
Prince Jron - footwork choreography
Yaman Okur - abstract freestyle choreography
Brahim Rachiki - tecktonik choreography
Jason Lester - tecktonik choreography
Natasha Bielenberg - Roma dance choreography
Flii Stylez - locking choreography
Danielle Polanco - waacking choreography
Stephone Webb - double Dutch choreography
Khadijah Maloney - double Dutch choreography assistant
Stacey Hipps - double Dutch choreography assistant
Shavonne Monfiston - double Dutch choreography assistant
Julian Phillips - boxing trainer

Wardrobe 
Arianne Phillips - designer
Riccardo Tisci for Givenchy - designer
Tom Ford - designer
Jeremy Scott - designer
Dolce & Gabbana - designer
Miu Miu - shoes designer
Stella McCartney - shoes designer

Crew 
Jamie King - creative director
Tiffany Olson - creative director assistant
Tony Villenueva - Madonna's dresser, costume crew chief
Dago Gonzales - video director
Chris Lamb - video producer
Eugene Riecansky - video director
Steven Klein - video director
James Lima - video director
Nathan Rissman - video director
Tom Munro - video director, tourbook photography
David Nord - video producer, editor
Giovanni Bianco - art direction, graphic design
Guy Oseary - manager
Liz Rozenberg - publicist
Jeff Bertuch - media servers

References

External links 

 Madonna.com > Tours > Sticky & Sweet Tour 2009
 Madonna.com > Tours > Sticky & Sweet Tour 2008 

Madonna concert tours
2008 concert tours
2009 concert tours
Cultural depictions of Barack Obama
Cultural depictions of Adolf Hitler
Cultural depictions of Al Gore
Cultural depictions of John Lennon
Cultural depictions of Mahatma Gandhi
Music controversies